Cuminia is a genus of flowering plant in the family Lamiaceae, first described in 1835. It contains only one known species, Cuminia eriantha. It is endemic to Robinson Crusoe Island, one of the Juan Fernández Islands in the southeast Pacific, off the coast of Chile and politically a part of that country.

Two varieties are recognized, regarded by some as distinct species:
Cuminia eriantha var. eriantha 
Cuminia eriantha var. fernandezia (Colla) Harley

The species is listed as "critically endangered."

References

Lamiaceae
Endemic flora of the Juan Fernández Islands
Monotypic Lamiaceae genera
Critically endangered plants
Robinson Crusoe Island
Taxonomy articles created by Polbot